Blue Ridge is a 2010 drama film set in the rural Blue Ridge Mountains of Virginia. Written and directed by Vince Sweeney. Starring Sean Gullette as the trailer park landlord, Mr. Johnston, Eric Sweeney (L.A. based actor) as J.T., and Audra Glyn Smith (N.C. based actress) as Sara, with a lot of other interesting small roles.

Premise
Sara falls for J.T., an unstable young man who lives in a rural trailer park. Together they plan a new life at the beach, operating a used amusement-park ride. Mr. Johnston has other plans for J.T. He wants to keep him tied to the trailer park and under his control and hopes to convince J.T. to join his questionable lifestyle. As pressure builds for J.T. to face his fear of change and the outside world, Sara holds on to the hope that they can push forward together and live out their dream.

Cast
 Sean Gullette as Mr. Johnston
 Eric Sweeney as J. T.
 Audra Glyn Smith as Sara
 Beverly Amsler as Female Cop

References

External links
 

2010 films
American drama films
2010 drama films
2010s English-language films
2010s American films